To Paint or Make Love is a 2005 French film directed by Arnaud Larrieu and Jean-Marie Larrieu.

The film was nominated for the Palme d'Or at the 2005 Cannes Film Festival.

Plot
The story is about a middle-aged couple, Madeleine and William who enjoy a comfortable, orderly life. They buy a house in a scenic rural setting and this changes their lives forever. They come across a younger pair, Adam and Eva, and the couples become attracted to each other. Their love results in an exploration of erotic desires and art in the idyllic French Alps.

As this unexpected journey begins, Madeleine and William try to comprehend what is happening in their lives and the swingers' lifestyle that they have fallen into. After a time. they find that the sexual interactions are both interesting and addictive.

When Adam and Eva leave France, Madeleine and William become unsettled and decide to sell their home and join Adam and Eva on a Pacific island.
The house-for-sale advertisement attracts some interested couples to a house inspection when another couple emerges. Madeleine and William invite them to stay for dinner, which turns into an erotic adventure as it had with Adam and Eva.

Suddenly, Madeleine and William understand that they need not go to the Pacific for the lifestyle as they can find romantic interactions in their current settings. Their realization between is dramatic.

Cast
Sabine Azéma as Madeleine
Daniel Auteuil as William
Amira Casar as Eva
Sergi López as Adam
Philippe Katerine as Mathieu
Florence Loiret Caille as Élise

References

External links
 

2005 films
2005 comedy films
2000s French-language films
Films directed by Arnaud Larrieu
Films directed by Jean-Marie Larrieu
French comedy films
2000s French films